John Wilhelm Brunius (26 December 1884 – 16 December 1937) was a Swedish actor, scriptwriter and film director.

Biography
In 1902, he  became   a student at the Royal Dramatic Theatre. After studying abroad, he was employed at the Dramaten in 1905. He was engaged by Albert Ranft as an actor at the   Svenska teatern  in Stockholm in 1907 where he remained until  1925. 
With spouse Pauline Brunius and colleague, Gösta Ekman (senior), he was the managing director of the theatre Oscarsteatern from 1926 to 1932.  From 1935 to 1937 he was employed by the Göteborgs Stadsteater in Gothenburg.

He was married from 1909 to 1935 to actress Pauline Brunius. He was the father of actress Anne-Marie Brunius and actor Palle Brunius.

Selected filmography
 Synnöve Solbakken (1919)
 Gyurkovicsarna (1920)
 Thora van Deken (1920)
 A Wild Bird (1921)
 A Fortune Hunter (1921)
 The Mill (1921)
 The Eyes of Love (1922)
 Iron Will (1923)
 Johan Ulfstjerna (1923)
 A Maid Among Maids (1924)
 Charles XII (1925)
 The Tales of Ensign Stål (1926)
 Gustaf Wasa (1928)
The Doctor's Secret (1930)
 The Two of Us (1930)
 Longing for the Sea (1931)
 The Red Day (1931)
 False Greta (1934)
 Melody of the Sea (1934)
 Happy Vestköping (1937)

References

External links

1884 births
1937 deaths
Male actors from Stockholm
Swedish theatre directors
Swedish male stage actors
Swedish male film actors
Swedish male silent film actors
20th-century Swedish male actors
Swedish film directors